George Millar (1874 – unknown) was a Scottish footballer. His regular position was as a forward. He played for Glasgow Perthshire, Chatham Town, and Manchester United.

External links
MUFCInfo.com profile

1874 births
Scottish footballers
Manchester United F.C. players
Glasgow Perthshire F.C. players
Chatham Town F.C. players
Year of death missing
Association football forwards